No, or the Vain Glory of Command is a 1990 Portuguese film directed by Manoel de Oliveira. The film, starring Luís Miguel Cintra and Miguel Guilherme, depicts a series of defeats from the entire military history of Portugal – the assassination of Viriathus, the Battle of Toro, the failed attempt of Iberian Union under Afonso of Portugal and Isabella of Spain and the Battle of Alcácer Quibir – and the Lusiads episode of the Island of love, which are told through flashbacks as a professorish Portuguese lieutenant recounts them while marching through a Portuguese African overseas territory in 1974, during the Portuguese Colonial War (1961–74). He easily draws his comrades into philosophical musings, while the little contingent suffers surprise attacks by groups of independentist guerrillas.

It was screened out of competition at the 1990 Cannes Film Festival.

Cast
 Luís Miguel Cintra – 2º Lt. Cabrita, Viriato, Dom João of Portugal
 Diogo Dória – Soldier Manuel, Lusitanian warrior, Dom João's cousin
 Miguel Guilherme – Soldier Salvador, Lusitanian warrior, Alcácer warrior
 Luís Lucas – Cpl. Brito, Lusitanian warrior, Alcácer nobleman
 Carlos Gomes – Soldier Pedro, Alcácer warrior
 António S. Lopes – Soldier, Lusitanian warrior, Alcácer warrior
 Mateus Lorena – Dom Sebastião
 Lola Forner – Princess Dona Isabel
 Raúl Fraire – Dom Afonso
 Ruy de Carvalho – Preacher at funeral, Suicidal warrior (as Rui de Carvalho)
 Teresa Menezes – Venus (as Teresa Meneses)
 Leonor Silveira – Tethys
 Paulo Matos – Radio operator, Vasco da Gama, Camões
 Francisco Baião – Prince Dom João
 Luís Mascarenhas – Dom Afonso V
 Duarte de Almeida – Baron of Alvito

References

External links
 

1990 films
1990s historical adventure films
Portuguese historical adventure films
1990s Portuguese-language films
1990 drama films
Films directed by Manoel de Oliveira
Adventure films based on actual events
Films produced by Paulo Branco